Allan McDonald (born 8 October 1975) is a Honduran editorial cartoonist. "McDonald" is a pen name; his real name is "Norman Allan Sauceda". Known for supporting the government of the deposed Manuel Zelaya that favored Hugo Chavez interference in Honduras. He worked for many years in El Heraldo:-,. In 2013, Allan received an award from the Press Emblem Campaign, an organization that focuses on increasing "the legal protection and safety of journalists". The award, "Protection of Journalists and Press Freedom 2013", had never been given to a cartoonist before.

He currently works for the Televicentro company -with right-wing ideology- where he illustrates social and sports issues.

References

External links 
 Interview with McDonald regarding his detainment
 McDonald's personal website (Archived on 14 September 2010) 
 Political Cartoons by Allan Mcdonald

Living people
Honduran artists
1975 births
Honduran editorial cartoonists